

Ladder

Ladder progress

Regular season

Knockout phase

Semi-finals
The top four teams from the group stage qualified for the semi finals.

Current squad 
Players with international caps are listed in bold.
Ages are given as of 17 December 2015, the date of the opening match of the tournament

Home attendance

References

External links
 Official website of the Perth Scorchers
 Official website of the Big Bash League

Perth Scorchers seasons